"A Defence of General Funston" is a satirical piece written by Mark Twain lampooning US Army General and expansionism advocate Frederick Funston. Funston had been a colonel during the Spanish–American and Philippine–American Wars, and Twain had been an outspoken critic of these wars, as immoral ventures of the American state into the imperialist subjugation of foreign peoples and territories.

In the piece, Twain essentially excoriates Funston as a scoundrel for the tactics he employed in capturing the Filipino president Emilio Aguinaldo, while at the same time facetiously arguing that Funston is not responsible for any of his actions since it was not Funston himself but his "inborn disposition" that determined his actions for him. As this is the only ground upon which Twain makes his "defence", the overall effect is to ironically and comically emphasize Twain's view that Funston's actions were completely indefensible.

References

External links
 

Essays by Mark Twain
Philippine–American War
Spanish–American War